Mudou Island is an island in Baisha Township, Penghu County, Taiwan. It is in the Taiwan Strait off the west coast of Taiwan. The island was formed from plateau basalt.

Name

The island was named Ba̍k-táu-sū at first because the shape resembles an ink marker of a carpenter.

See also
Islands of Taiwan

References

External links
 目斗嶼燈塔 ('Mudou Island Lighthouse') 

Baisha Township
Islands of the South China Sea
Islands of Taiwan
Landforms of Penghu County
Penghu Islands
Taiwan Strait